Midnight Sun is a South Korean musical produced by Shinswave in 2021, based on the 2006 Japanese movie A Song to the Sun.

History 
Midnight Sun is the second Korean musical adaptation of Japanese movie A Song to the Sun after the one staged in 2010. The musical is produced by Shin Jung-hwa and Son Hyuk-il; it's directed by Kim Ji-ho, with musics composed by Han Bo-ram and Kim Han-sol, who is also lyricist.

Production company Shinswave announced Midnight Sun in early March 2021 by revealing the casting of Shinee's Onew, Day6's Wonpil, Got7's Youngjae and Cho Hun for the male lead role of Haram, Kang Hye-in, Lovelyz's Kei and Lee Ah-jin for the female lead role of Haena, and Kim Ju-ho and Jung Eui-uk as Haena's father. Nu'est's Baekho as Haram was cast on March 30.

The musical debuted on May 1, 2021 at the BBHC Hall of Kwanglim Arts Center in Seoul, and ended on July 25, with a limited number of people in the audience due to social distancing norms. The whole show was also aired worldwide in 147 countries through the online live streaming platform MetaTheater, with English and Japanese subtitles, with the help of seven cameras.

In addition, Midnight Sun was live screened in South Korean cinemas on May 7 by CJ CGV in 29 theaters nationwide, as the tickets for the offline performance were sold out as soon as they went on sale. The same show was live broadcast in 15 movie theaters in Indonesia, 4 in Taiwan, 3 in Hong Kong, and 2 in Singapore. The two shows scheduled for May 9 were also screened in 20 movie theaters in Indonesia, 4 in Taiwan, 3 in Hong Kong, and 2 in Singapore, bringing the total live screenings across the five countries to 82. A total of seven performances were live screened abroad, while additional screenings were held in Korea at 20 cinemas on June 17 and 18.

Eighteen shows were made available as VOD on MetaTheater in August.

Synopsis 
Seo Haena is a girl who has to avoid the sun due to a rare disease called xeroderma pigmentosum, therefore she's only active at night, when she's used to go busking at the train station with her guitar. From her bedroom's window, every day Haena sees a high school boy with a surfboard with his friends. Haena is intrigued by him and, one night, while she's singing and playing the guitar outside, she sees him passing by, therefore she follows him and clumsily introduces herself. Noting that the boy wears the same school uniform as her, Haena's friend Bom offers to spy on him, and discovers his name is Jung Haram.

The next evening, Haena sits on a bench at the train station, and Haram arrives with his surfboard. Both embarrassed, they start talking, with Haram eventually promising to meet her and listen to her sing the next night. When they meet up, another street performer has occupied Haena's spot, so Haram takes her to a square, where a crowd gathers to hear her sing and play the guitar. Afterwards, they share their dreams about the future while watching the sea, and Haram asks her out.

Their date ends abruptly as the sun breaks and Haena rushes back home: Haram is therefore informed of her condition and, although initially taken aback, starts reading medical books to better understand. For a while, Haena stubbornly refuses to see him, while Haram takes up small jobs and sells his surfboard to pay for a recording studio where she could record her debut single. One night, Haena's father, out of concern, invites Haram over for dinner, and the boy reveals his plans for Haena's CD. As they walk home that night, the two begin to talk, and Haena slowly realizes how much Haram truly cares for her.

As her medical condition begins to worsen, the girl loses feeling in her hands, and is unable to play the guitar. Meanwhile, Haena and Haram enjoys their time together, going on dates like an ordinary couple, and she assures him that she still has her voice and wants to sing for him. In the studio, Haena asks her father and friends to leave and wait for the CD to hear her song.

Some time later, as promised, Haram brings Haena to the beach to watch him surf. She is in a wheelchair and wearing the protective suit she had left hanging for years. With a painful expression, her father tries to convince her that if she takes off the suit, she could run around freely, but she declines, saying she wants to live until the end. She then tells Haram about a city called Nordkapp in Norway where the sun never sets in summer, and about her wish to sing there one day under the midnight sun. While telling the story, Haena quietly dies.

Later on, Haram and Haena's friends and family listen to Haena's song, "Good-Bye Days", on the radio as it's finally released. With "Good-Bye Days" playing in his headphones, Haram goes to Nordkapp and meets Haena's ghost. The two hug promising to meet again underneath the sun so as not to be lonely, and be there for each other.

Musical numbers 
 "Prologue" – Haram, Noah, Hangyeol, Haena
 "Good Day" (좋은 하루) – All except Haena
 "Will My Day Ever Come?" (그런 날의 오게될까) – Haena
 "Such Beautiful Sunlight" (part 1) (이렇게 햇살이 예쁜데) – Junwoo
 "The Sun is in My Eyes" – Haram, Hangyeol, Noah
 "Will My Day Ever Come?" (reprise) (그런 날의 오게될까) – Haena
 "That Boy/That Girl" (part 1) (그 소년/그 소녀) – Bom, ensemble
 "That Boy/That Girl" (part 2) (그 소년/그 소녀) – Haram
 "Stranger in the Dark" – Dynamite
 "Milky Way Galaxy" – Haena, ensemble
 "A Melody Called You" (너라는 멜로디) – Haram, Haena
 "Such Beautiful Sunlight" (part 2) (이렇게 햇살이 예쁜데) – Junwoo, Bom
 "The Special You" (특별한 너) – Haram
 "Your Mystery" (part 1) – Hangyeol, Noah, Bom
 "Your Mystery" (part 2) – Hangyeol, Noah, Bom
 "Meet Me When the Sun Goes Down" (태양이지면 널 만나러 갈게) – Haram
 "Surprise/First Date" – Haram, Haena, Bom, Noah, Hangyeol, ensemble
 "How Did It Become Like This" (어떻게 이렇게 되어 버린 걸까) – Junwoo
 "Even If This Song Ends Someday" (이 노래가 언젠가 끝난다 해도) – All
 "Good-Bye Days" (part 2) – Haena
 "That Place, Nordkapp" (그곳, 노르카프) – All
 "Good-Bye Days" (part 3) – All except Haena
 "Meet Me When the Sun Goes Down" (reprise) (태양 아래서 널 만나러 갈게) – Haram, Haena

Cast 
 Jung Haram – Onew, Wonpil, Baekho, Cho Hun, Youngjae, Jinho
 Seo Haena – Kang Hye-in, Kei, Lee Ah-jin
 Seo Junwoo – Kim Ju-ho, Jung Eui-uk
 Lee Bom – Jung Da-ye, Joo Da-on
 Park Noah – Lee Chan-ryeol, Shin Eun-chong
Kang Hangyeol – Shin Eun-chong, Kim Kyung-rok
 Haena's doctor – Namgoong Hye-in, Kim Ha-na
 Ensemble – Park Sang-joon, Shin Dong-min, Ryu Han-saem, Cho Hyun-jin, Han Ga-ram

Shows 
On June 26 and July 3, Kei couldn't perform due to self-quarantine after Lovelyz' Seo Ji-soo tested positive for COVID-19, and was replaced by Kang Hye-in.

The performances initially scheduled for the evenings of July 18, 21 and 22 were cancelled due to new authorities guidelines about social distancing, which restricted gatherings of more than two people after 6 PM, bringing the number of shows to 95.

Original soundtrack 
Throughout the musical run, "Meet Me When the Sun Goes Down", "Good-Bye Days" and "Will My Day Ever Come?" were released as digital singles.

Part 1

Part 2

Part 3

Part 4

Part 5
The musical numbers were then published in a CD album on August 25, 2021 in five versions, one for every idol involved in the musical (Onew, Wonpil, Baekho, Youngjae and Kei). Each version contains the live performances of the corresponding idol, plus the studio versions of "Meet Me When the Sun Goes Down" and "Good-Bye Days". For Kei's version, "Meet Me When the Sun Goes Down" is replaced by "Will My Day Ever Come?".

Chart performance

Critical reception 
Midnight Sun was a box office success, selling out tickets during its run, and drawing favorable reviews from domestic as well as global audiences. Praises were directed to its melodic numbers, the lyrics, the stage directing and the moving performances of the actors. After two weeks, the online screening attracted 26,000 people from 80 countries, reaching 82,731 audiences from 114 countries by the end of its run. The number of offline and online audiences were similar, with 70% of the online audience made by foreigners. The sitzprobe, which aired online on April 24 before the opening, attracted 20,000 people.

Next Daily highlighted the faithful reproduction of the scenes from the original work, which were reinterpreted with a musical feeling, as the strength of the play, and stated that Haena and Haram's pursuit of the ordinary made people reflect on the new concept of normality brought about by the COVID-19 pandemic. However, it lamented that the short running time hindered Midnight Sun from showing the two main characters' emotions more delicately.

For The Voice of the People, "The development and subject matter presented universal emotions such as the freshness of a first love, the affection and the sadness of a terminally ill patient, and a family member watching over them. You can feel the familiarity that anyone can relate to, but on the other hand, it is also banal. There is no dramatic development, but you can find a quiet laugh in the cute stories such as the tactless first meeting, the affectionate unrequited crush, and the thrilling first love, and a familiar emotion is guaranteed in the story of Haram and Haena's family, who stay by Haena's side until the end."

References

External links 
 

2021 musicals
Musicals based on films
South Korean musicals